Linda Mertens (born 20 July 1978) is a Belgian singer. She was the female singer for the group Milk Inc.

Mertens was born in Wilrijk in Antwerp. She studied Art and after high school, she went to hairdresser school for two years. Her father is Flemish, and her mother Tunisian. In 2013 she appeared on VTM in Lang Leve... as herself, in an episode about Regi Penxten, a member of Milk Inc. In Lang Leve..., they made video's about the life of Regi, in an unserious way, and Linda's role was played by Karen Damen.

Discography

Albums with Milk Inc.
2000: Land of the Living
2001: Double Cream
2002: Milk Inc.
2003: Closer
2004: Best of Milk Inc.
2005: Closer (USA)
2006: Milk Inc. Essential
2006: Supersized
2006: Supersized XL
2007: Best Of
2008: Forever
2011: Nomansland
2011: 15 – The Very Best Of
2013: Undercover

Singles with Milk Inc.
2000: "Land of the Living"
2001: "Livin' a Lie"
2001: "Don't Cry"
2001: "Never Again"
2001: "Wide Awake"
2002: "Sleepwalker"
2002: "Breathe Without You"
2003: "Time"
2003: "The Sun Always Shines on TV"
2004: "I Don't Care" (with Silvy de Bie)
2004: "Whisper"
2005: "Blind"
2005: "Go to Hell"
2006: "Tainted Love"
2006: "Run"
2006: "No Angel"
2007: "Sunrise"
2007: "Tonight"
2008: "Forever"
2008: "Race"
2009: "Blackout"
2010: "Storm"
2010: "Chasing the Wind"
2011: "Fire"
2011: "Shadow"
2011: "I'll Be There (La Vache 2011)"
2012: "Miracle"
2013: "Last Night a DJ Saved My Life"
2013: "La Vache 2013"
2013: "Sweet Child O'Mine"
2013: "Imagination"
2014: "Don't Say Goodbye"

Singles with Jessy
2007: "Getting Out"

Singles with Esther Sels, Kate Ryan, Maaike Moens (The Quest) and Pascale Feront (Absolom)
2001: "Oh Baby I"

As guest with Sylver
2006: "Keep Your Hands"

References

External links 
Official website

1978 births
Living people
People from Wilrijk
Musicians from Antwerp
English-language singers from Belgium
Eurodance musicians
Trance singers
21st-century Belgian women singers
21st-century Belgian singers